This is a list of golf players who graduated from the Web.com Tour Finals in 2015. The top 25 players on the Web.com Tour's regular season money list in 2015 earned their PGA Tour card for 2016. The Finals determined the other 25 players to earn their PGA Tour cards and their priority order.

As in previous seasons, the Finals featured the top-75 players on the Web.com Tour's regular season money list, players ranked 126–200 on the PGA Tour's FedEx Cup regular season points list (except players exempt through other means), non-members of the PGA Tour with enough FedEx Cup regular season points to place 126–200, and special medical exemptions.

To determine the initial 2016 PGA Tour priority rank, the top 25 Web.com Tour's regular season players were alternated with the top 25 Web.com Tour Finals players. This priority order was then reshuffled several times during the 2016 season.

Patton Kizzire (Finals and regular season combined earnings) and Chez Reavie (Finals earnings) were fully exempt for the 2015–16 season and received invitations to The Players Championship. Patrick Rodgers was also fully exempt on the PGA Tour after earning enough FedEx Cup points as a PGA Tour non-member.

2015 Web.com Tour

*PGA Tour rookie in 2016
†First-time PGA Tour member in 2016, but ineligible for rookie status due to having played eight or more Tour events in a previous season
 Earned spot in Finals through PGA Tour.
 Earned spot in Finals through FedEx Cup points earned as a PGA Tour non-member.
 Indicates whether the player earned his card through the regular season or through the Finals.

Note: Kim Si-woo had previously been a PGA Tour member in the 2013 season, but did not play ten events and retained his rookie status.

Results on 2015–16 PGA Tour

*PGA Tour rookie in 2016
†First-time PGA Tour member in 2016, but ineligible for rookie status due to having played eight or more Tour events in a previous season
 Retained his PGA Tour card for 2017: won or finished in the top 125 of the money list or FedEx Cup points list.
 Retained PGA Tour conditional status and qualified for the Web.com Tour Finals: finished between 126–150 on FedEx Cup list and qualified for Web.com Tour Finals.
 Failed to retain his PGA Tour card for 2017 but qualified for the Web.com Tour Finals: finished between 150–200 on FedEx Cup list.
 Failed to retain his PGA Tour card for 2017 and to qualify for the Web.com Tour Finals: finished outside the top 200 on FedEx Cup list.

Miguel Ángel Carballo, Kelly Kraft, Rod Pampling, Michael Thompson, and Tim Wilkinson regained their cards through the 2016 Web.com Tour Finals.

Winners on the PGA Tour in 2016

Runners-up on the PGA Tour in 2016

*Shortened to 54 holes due to poor weather conditions.

References

External links
Web.com Tour official site

Korn Ferry Tour
PGA Tour
Web.com Tour Finals graduates
Web.com Tour Finals graduates